The Nokia 6510 is a mobile phone launched in the first quarter of 2002.

It was an improved version of the Nokia 8310.  It featured a higher resolution screen with teal, instead of white, backlit illumination, and blue keypad illumination. It also featured several new applications, such as the electronic wallet, used to store password protected information, and an upgraded calendar.

As a business-oriented product, it incorporated a more restrained look, although the covers were interchangeable with the 8310.

References

External links 
 Official webpage
 Nokia 6510 at GSMArena
 Nokia 6510 at Esato

6510
Mobile phones introduced in 2002
Mobile phones with infrared transmitter